The Unwelcome Guest is a 1913 American silent drama film directed by  D. W. Griffith.

Plot
Just before she dies, an elderly married woman stashes the horde of money she's secretly accumulated beneath the false bottom of an old shipping trunk. After her death, her husband, believing himself penniless, has to leave their old home and move in with his son's family, where he's treated with no respect or consideration. Also on the scene is a newly hired kindly young housekeeper (Mary Pickford); she and the old gentleman become close friends and eventually run away together (taking the old shipping trunk with them).

Cast
 Mary Pickford - The Slavey
 W. Chrystie Miller - The Old Father
 Charles Hill Mailes - The Son
 Claire McDowell - The Wife
 Jack Pickford - One of the Children
 Elmer Booth - The Hired Hand
 Kate Bruce - The Old Wife
 Harry Carey - The Sheriff
 J. Jiquel Lanoe - The Doctor
 Lionel Barrymore - At Auction
 Frank Evans - At Auction
 Lillian Gish - At Auction
 Adolph Lestina - At Auction
 W. C. Robinson - At Auction

See also
 Harry Carey filmography
 D. W. Griffith filmography
 Lillian Gish filmography
 Lionel Barrymore filmography

References

External links

1913 films
1913 drama films
1913 short films
American silent short films
American black-and-white films
Films directed by D. W. Griffith
Silent American drama films
1910s American films
1910s English-language films